William T. Corbett (1902 – April 17, 1971) was a United States Department of the Interior attorney who served as Secretary of Guam under Ford Quint Elvidge, and later became as the interim Governor of Guam from May 19, 1956, to October 2, 1956. He was the brother of Representative Robert J. Corbett. Graduating from the University of Pittsburgh College of Arts and Sciences in 1924 and the University of Pittsburgh School of Law in 1927, Corbett opened a private workers' compensation law firm before joining the Department of the Interior. He died on April 17, 1971, at the Northern Virginia Doctors Hospital at the age of 69.

References

Lawyers who have represented the United States government
Governors of Guam
University of Pittsburgh alumni
University of Pittsburgh School of Law alumni
1971 deaths
Secretaries of Guam
1902 births
Guamanian Republicans
20th-century American politicians